West Bromwich was a borough constituency represented in the House of Commons of the Parliament of the United Kingdom from 1885 until 1974. It centred on West Bromwich, in the West Midlands.  It elected one Member of Parliament (MP) by the first past the post voting system.

History
The constituency was created by the Redistribution of Seats Act 1885 for the 1885 general election.  It was abolished for the February 1974 general election, when it was divided into West Bromwich East and West Bromwich West. Most of the original West Bromwich constituency formed the new West Bromwich East constituency, while the new West Bromwich West constituency consisted largely of Tipton and Wednesbury - both of which had been added to an expanded West Bromwich borough in 1966. In 1974, just after the February general election, the borough of West Bromwich ceased to exist when it merged with the short-lived County Borough of Warley (which was centred on Oldbury, Smethwick and Rowley Regis) to form Sandwell.

Boundaries
1885–1918: The municipal borough of West Bromwich.

1918-1950: The County Borough of West Bromwich.

Members of Parliament

Elections

Elections in the 1880s

Elections in the 1890s

Elections in the 1900s

Elections in the 1910s 

A petition was lodged regarding this election but was later dismissed. The first count had Legge on 5,046 votes, while Hazel had 5,041 votes. A recount put Legge on 5,029 votes, while Hazel had 4,987 votes. Further scrutiny led to the above results.

General Election 1914–15:

Another General Election was required to take place before the end of 1915. The political parties had been making preparations for an election to take place and by July 1914, the following candidates had been selected; 
Unionist: William Legge
Liberal: Alfred Hazel

Liberal candidate Alfred Hazel withdrew at the last minute

Elections in the 1920s

Elections in the 1930s

Elections in the 1940s 

Changes are calculated against the results of the 1935 general election, rather than the uncontested 1941 by-election

Elections in the 1950s

Elections in the 1960s

Elections in the 1970s

References 

Politics of Sandwell
Parliamentary constituencies in the West Midlands (county) (historic)
Parliamentary constituencies in Staffordshire (historic)
Constituencies of the Parliament of the United Kingdom established in 1885
Constituencies of the Parliament of the United Kingdom disestablished in 1974
West Bromwich